Grantham Preparatory School is a private preparatory school in Grantham, Lincolnshire, England.

History
It was founded in 1986 by a local individual. The school is now operated by A for E Limited, a subsidiary of the International
Education Systems (IES) Limited organisation, and is administered by a board of three directors.

Curriculum
The school curriculum was rated outstanding in the 2008 Ofsted inspection.

Extracurricular activities
The 2011 ISI Inspection noted that the school "wins many awards in local music and speech and drama festivals, and in 2010 gained the Gold Artsmark award in recognition of the high standards achieved in art, music, dance and drama."

References

External links
School Website
Profile on the ISC website
ISI Inspection Reports

Preparatory schools in Lincolnshire
Schools in Grantham
Member schools of the Independent Schools Association (UK)